John Price (born 1933 in Berlin, Germany) is an American diplomat. He served as United States Ambassador to Mauritius and the Seychelles. He is a member of the Council of American Ambassadors and CEO of JP Realty.

Biography
Price was born Hans Joachim Praiss to a Jewish family in Germany in 1933 and experienced Kristallnacht as a child. His family left Germany in April 1939, first for Panama and then the United States where they had relatives. He moved to Utah at the age of 18 and earned a B.A. at the University of Utah in 1956. In 1957, he founded J. Price Construction Co. and later, renamed JP Realty, Inc. In January 1994, the company filed an IPO on the New York Stock Exchange.

He served as a trustee Administrator at the University of Utah from 1992 to 1999. He also has been an active supporter of George W. Bush. In 1957, he married Utah native Marcia Poulsen whom he met in college; they have three children.

References

1934 births
University of Utah alumni
Living people
Ambassadors of the United States to Mauritius
Ambassadors of the United States to Seychelles
20th-century American Jews
American people of German-Jewish descent
American real estate businesspeople
Utah Republicans
21st-century American Jews
21st-century American diplomats